Sakty (Saqtı) is a rural locality (a selo) in Pisarevsky Selsoviet, Sharansky District, Bashkortostan, Russia. The population was 260 as of 2010. There are 3 streets.

Geography 
Sakty is located 31 km north of Sharan (the district's administrative centre) by road. Novoknyazevo is the nearest rural locality.

References 

Rural localities in Sharansky District